Albert Jarvis Hopkins (August 15, 1846August 23, 1922) was a Congressman and U.S. Senator from Illinois.

Biography
Hopkins was born near Cortland, Illinois on August 15, 1846. He was admitted to the bar in 1871 and practiced in Aurora.

He married Emma Stolp on September 9, 1873, and they had four children.

He was elected to fill out the congressional term of Reuben Ellwood in 1885 and was re-elected in his own right for eight full terms, serving from 1885 through 1903. In 1903, he successfully ran for the U.S. Senate. His reelection bid in 1908 was unsuccessful and he returned to practice law in Aurora.

He died at his home in Aurora on August 23, 1922.

References

External links
 
 

1846 births
1922 deaths
People from Cortland, Illinois
Hillsdale College alumni
Illinois lawyers
Republican Party United States senators from Illinois
Republican Party members of the United States House of Representatives from Illinois
19th-century American lawyers